Miloš Galin (born 22 April 1990) is a Bosnia Herzegovina professional footballer who plays as a striker for Maltese Premier League club Sliema Wanderers.

Club career
In January 2015, Galin signed a two-year contract with Algerian Ligue Professionnelle 1 club CR Belouizdad. On January 30, he made his debut for the club as a starter in a league match against USM Alger.

He later played for German lower league sides Lichtenauer FV and CSC 03 Kassel.

References

External links
 

1990 births
Living people
People from Bihać
Association football forwards
Bosnia and Herzegovina footballers
NK Jedinstvo Bihać players
FK Rad players
OFK Mladenovac players
FK Donji Srem players
FK Drina Zvornik players
NK Bratstvo Gračanica players
Kalamata F.C. players
FK Sloboda Tuzla players
CR Belouizdad players
Milos Galin
Milos Galin
Sliema Wanderers F.C. players
Shabab Al Sahel FC players
FK Sloboda Novi Grad players
Premier League of Bosnia and Herzegovina players
First League of the Federation of Bosnia and Herzegovina players
Gamma Ethniki players
Algerian Ligue Professionnelle 1 players
Lebanese Second Division players
Milos Galin
Maltese Premier League players
Bosnia and Herzegovina expatriate footballers
Expatriate footballers in Serbia
Bosnia and Herzegovina expatriate sportspeople in Serbia
Expatriate footballers in Greece
Bosnia and Herzegovina expatriate sportspeople in Greece
Expatriate footballers in Algeria
Expatriate footballers in Thailand
Expatriate footballers in Malta
Bosnia and Herzegovina expatriate sportspeople in Malta
Expatriate footballers in Lebanon
Bosnia and Herzegovina expatriate sportspeople in Lebanon
Expatriate footballers in Germany
Bosnia and Herzegovina expatriate sportspeople in Germany
Serbs of Bosnia and Herzegovina